The East Arnhem Region is a local government area of the Northern Territory, Australia, governed by the East Arnhem Regional Council.

East Arnhem Region was created under the Local Government Act (NT) 2008 to provide core local government services. The area comprises nine major remote communities, many homelands and outstations, commercial enterprises such as tourism, two mining leases, and pastoral properties scattered throughout the council area. 

Five of the nine communities are located on islands.  Six of the communities are recognised Remote Service Delivery Sites by the Commonwealth and another is recognised as a NT Government Territory Growth Town.

History
In October 2006 the Northern Territory Government announced the reform of local government areas. The intention of the reform was to improve and expand the delivery of services to towns and communities across the Northern Territory by establishing eight new shires. The East Arnhem Shire was created on 1 July 2008.

Elections of shire councillors were held on 25 October 2008. Banambi Wunungmurra was elected unopposed as the inaugural EASC president, with Councillor Keith Hansen of Anindilyakwa Ward serving from 2008 to 2010 as his deputy, then rotating the deputy position to Councillor Kaye Thurlow of Gumurr Marthakal from 2010 to 2012. Wunungmurra was re-elected unopposed in 2012, with Councillor Mavis Danganbarr of Gumurr Marthakal Ward currently serving as his deputy for a two-year term.

On 1 January 2014, the shire became a region.

Most of the land in the region was previously unincorporated, but the following communities were amalgamated into it:
 Angurugu Community
 Marngarr Community

Wards and representation
The East Arnhem Regional Council is divided into 6 wards, which is governed by 14 councillors:
 Anindilyakwa Ward (2) - Groote Eylandt including Angurugu, Umbakumba and Milyakburra (Bickerton Island), and neighboring islands
 Birr Rawarrang Ward (2) - Ramingining and surrounding areas
 Gumurr Gatjirrk Ward  (2) - Milingimbi and surrounding areas
 Gumurr Marthakal Ward (3) - Elcho Island including Galiwinku and surrounding areas 
 Gumurr Miwatj Ward (3) - Yirrkala and Gunyangara (also known as Marngarr or Ski Beach) and surrounding areas
 Gumurr Miyarrka Ward (3) - Gapuwiyak (Lake Evella) and surrounding areas

Presidents

President
 Banambi Wunungmurra, 12 November 2008 - current

Deputy president
 Mavis Danganbarr, 11 April 2012 – current
 Kaye Thurlow, 10 November 2010 – 11 April 2012
 Keith Hansen, 2 November 2008 – 10 November 2010

Council members

Anindilyakwa Ward
 Jabani Lalara, 2 April 2012 - current
 Constantine Mamarika, 2 April 2012 - current
 Keith Hansen, 31 October 2008 -1 April 2012
 Keith Mamarika	, 31 October 2008 -	1 April 2012
 Lionel Jaragba, 31 October 2008 - 17 November 2011

Birr Rawarrang Ward
 Peter Djumbu, 2 April 2012 - current
 Rose Wurrguwurrgu, 2 April 2012 - current

Gumurr Gattjirrk Ward
 Lily Roy, 24 April 2012 -current
 John Ryan, 24 April 2012 - current
 Alvin Marrpindiwuy Gaykamangu, 16 November 2011 - 1 April 2012
 Ronnie Garrawurra, 27 July 2011 - 1 April 2012
 Galirrimun Dhurrkay*, 7 March 2010 - 28 February 2012
 Burrbam*, 31 October 2008 - 11 August 2011
 Wuduwal*, 31 October 2008 - 25 May 2011
 David Daymirringu Warraya, 31 October 2008 - 7 November 2011

Gumurr Marthakal Ward
 Alfred Gondarra, 2 April 2012 - current
 Kaye Thurlow, 31 October 2008 - current
 Mavis Danganbarr Garrawurra, 31 October 2008 - current
 Don Wininba Ganambarr, 31 October 2008 - 1 April 2012

Gumurr Miwatj Ward
 Barayuwa Mununggurr, 31 October 2008 - current
 Yananymul Mununggurr, 31 October 2008 - current
 Banambi Wunungmurra, 31 October 2008 - current

Gumurr Miyarrka Ward

 Gawura Wanambi, 2 April 2012 - current
 Wesley Bandi Wunungmurra, 2 April 2012 - current

* Indicates funeral name

Localities and communities
Land within the East Arnhem Region was divided during 2007 into bounded areas for the purpose of creating an address for a property.  The bounded areas are called "localities" with those localities associated with existing aboriginal communities being called "communities".

Localities
Anindilyakwa	
East Arnhem

Communities
Angurugu	
Galiwinku	
Gapuwiyak
Gunyangara
Milingimbi	
Milyakburra	
Ramingining
Umbakumba
Yirrkala

References

External links
Map of LGAs
Policy details
map of wards

East Arnhem Shire
Arnhem Land